Alandurai is a panchayat town in Coimbatore district in the state of Tamil Nadu, India. It falls under Perur taluk. It is a western suburb of Coimbatore, which comes under the Coimbatore Municipal Corporation. It lies very close to Kerala border and is located between Madavarayapuram and Pooluvapatti.

Alandurai village is a growing locality and has many shops. Siruvani Main Road passes through Alandurai. Way to Isha Yoga Center and Karunya Educational Institutions pass through Alandurai.

Demographics
As of 2001 Census of India, Alandurai had a population of 7173. Males constitute 50% of the population and females 50%. Alandurai has an average literacy rate of 55%, lower than the national average of 59.5%; with 58% of the males and 42% of females literate. 11% of the population is under 6 years of age.

References

Cities and towns in Coimbatore district
Suburbs of Coimbatore